Baronia brevicornis, commonly known as the short-horned baronia, is a species of butterfly in the monotypic genus Baronia and is placed in a subfamily of its own, the Baroniinae, a sister group of the remainder of the swallowtail butterflies. It is endemic to a very small area of Mexico, where the distribution is patchy and restricted.

The genus is named after Oscar Theodor Baron who collected the first specimen in the Sierra Madre region of Mexico. The species was then described by Salvin.

Morphological characteristics include an abdominal scent organ in females.

Baronia is unique among swallowtail butterflies or their relatives in having an Acacia species, Acacia cochliacanha (family Leguminosae) as its larval food plant.

Taxonomy
Baronia brevicornis is of particular importance due to its relict nature and uncertain relationship to other subfamilies such as the Parnassiinae. It is now considered to represent the monotypic subfamily Baroniinae. The butterfly was considered as the most primitive extant papilionid taxon and shares some features with the fossil taxon Praepapilio, and a comprehensive 2018 molecular phylogeny suggests that they are a sister group of the remainder of the Papilionidae.

Subspecies
 B. b. brevicornis
 B. b. rufodiscalis

References

Illustrated works:
Edwin Möhn, 2002 Schmetterlinge der Erde, Butterflies of the world Part XIIII (14), Papilionidae VIII: Baronia, Euryades, Protographium, Neographium, Eurytides. Edited by Erich Bauer and Thomas Frankenbach Keltern: Goecke & Evers; Canterbury: Hillside Books.  All species and subspecies are included, also most of the forms. Several females are shown the first time in colour.
Lewis, H. L., 1974 Butterflies of the World  Page 23, figure 6, female.

External links

Pteron Undersides on right.
Images
Markku Savela's website
BOA Photographs of type specimens including types of subspecies

Endemic Lepidoptera of Mexico
Taxa named by Osbert Salvin
Monotypic butterfly genera
Taxonomy articles created by Polbot